The men's marathon at the 1981 Summer Universiade was held in Bucharest on 26 July 1981. It was the first time that this event was held at the Universiade.

Results

References

Athletics at the 1981 Summer Universiade
1981